The women's long jump event  at the 1979 European Athletics Indoor Championships was held on 24 February in Vienna.

Results

References

Long jump at the European Athletics Indoor Championships
Long
Euro